Robert Parsons was an English priest in the late 16th and early 17th centuries.

Parsons  was educated at University College, Oxford.  He held livings at Shabbington, Waddesdon and Oddington. He was Archdeacon of Gloucester from 1703 until his death on 8 July 1714.

References

1714 deaths
Alumni of University College, Oxford
Archdeacons of Gloucester
16th-century English Anglican priests
17th-century English Anglican priests